Color Changes is an album by trumpeter Clark Terry featuring performances recorded in late 1960 and originally released on the Candid label.

Reception

Scott Yanow of Allmusic says, "This is one of flügelhornist Clark Terry's finest albums. Terry had complete control over the music and, rather than have the usual jam session, he utilized an octet and arrangements by Yusef Lateef, Budd Johnson, and Al Cohn. ...The material, which consists of originals by Terry, Duke Jordan, Lateef, and Bob Wilber, is both rare and fresh, and the interpretations always swing. Highly recommended". Describing it as the leader's best album, The Penguin Guide to Jazz Recordings says that the variety of tones provided by the arrangement of the various horn players is particularly striking.

Track listing
All compositions by Clark Terry except as indicated
 "Blue Waltz (La Valse Bleue)" (Chester Conn) - 6:37
 "Brother Terry" (Yusef Lateef) - 3:54
 "Flutin' and Fluglin'" - 6:46
 "No Problem" (Duke Jordan) - 5:49
 "La Rive Gauche" - 5:28
 "Nahstye Blues" - 6:00
 "Chat Qui Peche (A Cat That Fishes)" - 7:32

Personnel
Clark Terry - trumpet, flugelhorn
Yusef Lateef - tenor saxophone, flute, English horn, oboe
Seldon Powell - tenor saxophone, flute
Julius Watkins - French horn
Jimmy Knepper - trombone
Tommy Flanagan - piano
Budd Johnson - piano (track 6)
Joe Benjamin - bass
Ed Shaughnessy - drums

References

Candid Records albums
Clark Terry albums
1961 albums
Albums produced by Nat Hentoff